Oliang (also spelt oleang and olieng), commonly known as Thai iced coffee, is a popular Thai beverage. Oliang is prepared from a mixture of Robusta coffee grounds, brown sugar, and various grains and seeds like cardamom, corn, soybeans, rice, and sesame seeds. The drink is noted for its coffee aroma and smoky notes from high-roasted grains and seeds.

Origins 
The name oliang is derived from the Teochew Chinese pronunciation of 烏涼, which literally means "black and iced," in reference to the black iced coffee concoction. Teochews comprise the majority of the Thai Chinese population.

Preparation 

Traditionally, oliang is brewed with a Thai coffee filter called tungdtom, a tea/coffee sock with a metal ring and handle to which a cotton cloth bag is attached. It is also used for making Thai tea. To make Thai coffee, put the oliang into the coffee sock and pour boiling water through it into a carafe. Let the bag steep for approximately 10 minutes until strong. Oliang is sometimes served with condensed milk, or with a small pitcher of evaporated milk, and one of simple syrup with which the drinker can sweeten the oliang to their taste.

Variations 
Oliang can be customized as follows:

 Black coffee with ice = oliang
 Black coffee with condensed milk = kopi
 Black coffee with ice and fresh milk = oliang yok lor
 Black coffee with condensed milk, ice, and fresh milk = iced coffee (kafae yen)

References

See also

 Thai tea

Thai drinks
Coffee drinks